Gunnar Atle Pettersen (born 30 July 1955) is a Norwegian former team handball player, and a former head coach of the Norwegian national team.

Playing career
Pettersen played 132 matches and scored 445 goals for the Norway men's national handball team between 1978 and 1987. He has his education from the Norwegian School of Sport Sciences.

Coaching career
He coached the national team from 1989 to 1994, and again from 2001 to 2008. His best international achievements are the 7th place at the 2005 World Men's Handball Championship and the 6th place at the 2008 European Championships. After securing Norway a place in the 2009 World Championship, he announced that he would not continue as the national team head coach when his contract ran out, 313 October 2008.

2008 European Championships
Pettersen's team won the preliminary group B of the 2008 European Men's Handball Championship and qualified for the Main group, after beating later champions Denmark, Russia and Montenegro. After tying later silver medalists Croatia in their last match in the Main group, the team missed the semifinals.

References

1955 births
Living people
Norwegian male handball players
Norwegian handball coaches
National team coaches
Norwegian School of Sport Sciences alumni